Moskog is a small forested area in the municipality of Sunnfjord in Vestland county, Norway.  It's located along the river Jølstra, just northwest of the lake Holsavatnet.  At Moskog, the concurrency of National Road 5 and the E39 highway meets County Road 13.

References

Geography of Vestland
Sunnfjord